In computing, bit flipping may refer to:

 Bit manipulation, algorithmic manipulation of binary digits (bits)
 Bitwise operation NOT, performing logical negation to a single bit, or each of several bits, switching state 0 to 1, and vice versa
 Memory error or soft error, an unintentional state switch from 0 to 1, or vice versa, of a bit stored to random access memory or other medium

See also 
 Bit-flipping attack
 Single-event upset